Amélia is a 2001 Brazilian comedy-drama film directed by Ana Carolina, inspired by the visit of French actress Sarah Bernhardt to Brazil, in 1905. In the film, the actress is under a professional and personal crisis, but is induced by her Brazilian housekeeper, Amélia, to start performing in Rio de Janeiro. However, the actress is forced to live with the exotic sisters of Amélia.

Ana Carolina had already written the screenplay for the film in 1989, but does not produced due to lack of money. It was shot in Pernambuco and Rio de Janeiro. It debuted at the Biarritz Film Festival where Béatrice Agenin won the best actress award. The film received three nominations at the Grande Prêmio do Cinema Brasileiro in the categories of best actress, for Miriam Muniz, best screenplay and best art direction.

Cast

 Marília Pêra as  Amélia 
 Béatrice Agenin as Sarah Bernhardt 
 Camilla Amado as Oswalda 
 Pedro Bismark   
 Alice Borges as Maria Luiza 
 Marcélia Cartaxo   
 Betty Gofman as  Vicentine 
 Xuxa Lopes   
 Duda Mamberti   
 Miriam Muniz as  Francisca 
 Otávio Terceiro as Otávio III 
 Cristina Pereira   
 Pedro Paulo Rangel

References

External links
 

2001 films
2001 comedy-drama films
Brazilian comedy-drama films
Films set in the 1900s
Fiction set in 1905
Biographical films about actors
Films directed by Ana Carolina
Films shot in Pernambuco
Films shot in Rio de Janeiro (state)
Cultural depictions of Sarah Bernhardt
2000s Portuguese-language films